Norma Violeta Dávila Salinas is a Mexican teacher and politician affiliated with the Institutional Revolutionary Party. She served as Deputy of the LIX Legislature of the Mexican Congress representing Coahuila as replacement of Óscar Pimentel González, and previously served in the LV Legislature of the Congress of Coahuila.

References

Date of birth unknown
Living people
Politicians from Coahuila
Women members of the Chamber of Deputies (Mexico)
Institutional Revolutionary Party politicians
Year of birth missing (living people)
21st-century Mexican politicians
21st-century Mexican women politicians
Members of the Congress of Coahuila
Deputies of the LIX Legislature of Mexico
Members of the Chamber of Deputies (Mexico) for Coahuila